HGV Video Productions, Inc. was a Canadian home video company that was originally formed in 1989 as the Canadian branch of Video Treasures, Burbank Video, Media Home Entertainment and GoodTimes Entertainment, distributing releases from those companies into Canada. Its headquarters were located in Ajax, Ontario. In August 2002, the company was renamed to Anchor Bay Canada after it was later folded into its parent company.

References

Home video companies of Canada
Former Lionsgate subsidiaries